The 2005–06 FA Trophy was the thirty-sixth season of the FA Trophy.

Grays Athletic defended their trophy, only the fourth time this has been achieved in the competition's history.

1st qualifying round

Ties

Replays

2nd qualifying round

Ties

Replays

3rd qualifying round
The teams from Conference North and Conference South entered in this round.

Ties

Replays

1st round
The teams from Conference National entered in this round.

Ties

Replays

2nd round

Ties

Replays

3rd round

Ties

Replays

Quarter finals

Ties

Replays

Semi finals

First leg

Second leg

Final

References

General
 Football Club History Database: FA Trophy 2005-06

Specific

2005–06 domestic association football cups
League
2005-06